Kiganda may refer to:
Kiganda, Murang'a, central Kenya 
Buganda
Kiganda, Bisoro, Burundi
Kiganda, Bururi, Burundi
Kiganda, Muramviya, Burundi
 Commune of Kiganda, whose seat is in Kiganda, Muramviya
Kiganda, Rwanda
Kiganda, Mubende, Uganda
Kiganda, Kamuli, Uganda